Mind Games is an American comedy-drama television series created by Kyle Killen that aired on ABC. The show is about two brothers who run a problem solving firm called Edwards and Associates that employs solutions based on psychological manipulation. It premiered on February 25, 2014, and was canceled on March 27, 2014.

Cast and characters
Steve Zahn as Clark Edwards, an ex-psychology professor who suffers from bipolar disorder.  Clark is also an expert in human behavior from a psychological perspective.
Christian Slater as Ross Edwards, a con man with a criminal record, who is Clark's brother.
Megalyn Echikunwoke as Megan Shane, an actress.
Wynn Everett as Claire Edwards, ex-wife of Ross Edwards.
Gregory Marcel as Miles Hood, who had been a top graduate student in Clark's department.
Cedric Sanders as Latrell Griffin, whose specialty is business development.
Jaime Ray Newman as Samantha "Sam" Gordon, an ex-con.
Katherine Cunningham as Beth Scott, Clark's girlfriend.

Production and development
About the show, Kyle Killen says "It’s a weird workplace drama that’s set around this idea that we’ve conducted 60 years worth of research into the science of human behavior and manipulation. So this is a one-of-a-kind company that is trying to turn all that research into a weekly “Wag the Dog” kind of problem-solving company." He also said "I was just genuinely excited by the science and way these observations about human nature and the ways we're influenced without knowing it were coming out of the lab and being used to shape real world outcomes.  It's an incredible amount of fun" He reiterated his enthusiasm during the Television Critics Association press tour saying "In terms of the likability of the characters, these are brothers who would like to connect and help people... [...] It certainly started with the idea of a moral grey area, but this has mainstream [appeal]." The show was originally titled  Influence. Although there is a human behavior consulting firm in Chicago, TGG Group, the show is not based on this firm.

The show's initial episode order was filmed in Chicago at a record-setting time when Chicago had six television shows (Mind Games, Betrayal, Crisis, Chicago PD, the returning Chicago Fire, and Sirens) as well as three major motion pictures (Transformers: Age of Extinction, Jupiter Ascending, and Divergent) that were all filming simultaneously. Killen is joined by Keith Redman as an executive producer. The show was a 20th Century Fox Television production.

In May 2013, the show was announced as part of the 2013–14 schedule with Christian Slater and Steve Zahn as the stars. Megalyn Echikunwoke, Cedric Sanders, Gregory Marcel and Wynn Everett were announced as part of the supporting cast at that time.  In August, Jaime Ray Newman was added to the cast.

On March 27, 2014, after five episodes were aired, the show was canceled due to low ratings.

According to IMDb, the remaining episodes aired in Japan, starting on July 15, 2014. The remaining episodes also aired in the UK.  For US residents, the remaining episodes can be purchased through Amazon streaming.

Episodes

Reception
TV Equals' P. T. Jackson viewed the show as appealing because it was a program "with characters that think outside the box but have hearts of gold and help people". He likened the show to Franklin & Bash for its outrageous quirkiness. Zap2it's Laurel Brown said that the characters' life histories "help them get inside the human mind better than anyone else". The show was also described as having similarities to Leverage.

TV.com's Tim Surette called it the second most anticipated new show for midseason 2014, saying, "This could be the fun, underdog drama that ABC has been searching for. After the pilot's airing he said, "When compared to Killen's past work, Mind Games doesn't hold up in terms of ambition and risk. But there's enough piquant possibility here to make it a daring experiment in the procedural genre."

References

External links
 
 
  
 Mind Games at The Futon Critic
 
 

2010s American comedy-drama television series
2014 American television series debuts
2014 American television series endings
American Broadcasting Company original programming
English-language television shows
Television series by 20th Century Fox Television
Television shows set in Chicago
Fiction about mind control
Bipolar disorder in fiction